Gerald Ingram (born 19 August 1947) is an English former professional footballer who played as a striker. Active in both England and the United States between 1966 and 1980, Ingram made nearly 500 professional league career appearances, scoring nearly 200 goals.

Career
Born in Beverley, Ingram began his career with local side Hull Brunswick before playing in the Football League for  Blackpool, Preston North End and Bradford City. Ingram later played in the North American Soccer League for the Washington Diplomats, the Las Vegas Quicksilvers, the San Diego Sockers, the Chicago Sting and the California Surf.

References
 Post War English & Scottish Football League A - Z Player's Transfer Database
NASL career stats

1947 births
Living people
English footballers
Hull Brunswick F.C. players
Blackpool F.C. players
Preston North End F.C. players
Bradford City A.F.C. players
North American Soccer League (1968–1984) indoor players
North American Soccer League (1968–1984) players
Chicago Sting (NASL) players
Washington Diplomats (NASL) players
Las Vegas Quicksilver players
San Diego Sockers (NASL) players
California Surf players
Association football forwards
English expatriate sportspeople in the United States
Expatriate soccer players in the United States
English expatriate footballers
Sportspeople from Beverley